The 2014–15 season is PAS Giannina F.C.'s 20th competitive season in the top flight of Greek football, 5th season in the Super League Greece, and 49th year in existence as a football club. They also compete in the Greek Cup.

Players 
Updated:30 June 2015

International players

Foreign players

Personnel

Management

Coaching staff

medical staff

Academy

Transfers

Summer

In

Out

Winter

In 
-

Out

Pre-season and friendlies

Competitions

Super League Greece

League table

Results summary

Fixtures

Greek cup 
PAS Giannina will enter the Greek Cup at the Group stage.

Group B

Matches

Round of 16

Statistics

Appearances 

Super League Greece

Goalscorers 

Super League Greece

Matches with Niki Volou and OFI awarded 0-3 by FA decision.

Clean sheets

Best goal and MVP awards winners

Disciplinary record

Awards 
Best Manager in Greece:Giannis Petrakis

Best Goalkeeper in Greece:Markos Vellidis

Best Young player in Greece:Charis Charisis

Best 11 (Goalkeeper):Markos Vellidis

References

External links 

 Official Website

PAS Giannina F.C. seasons
Greek football clubs 2014–15 season